The following is a list of squads for each of the 12 teams competing in EuroBasket 1987, held in Athens, Greece between 3 and 14 June 1987. Each team selected a squad of twelve players for the tournament.

Group A

France

Greece

Romania

Soviet Union

Spain

Yugoslavia

Group B

Czechoslovakia

Israel

Italy

Netherlands

Poland

West Germany

References
 1987 European Championship for Men, FIBA.com.
 European Championship 1987 - National Squads, LinguaSport.com.

1987